On 2 December 1971, the United Arab Emirates was established as a federal independent country with the participation of the following emirates: Abu Dhabi, Dubai, Sharjah, Ajman, Fujairah and Umm Al Quwain. Zayed bin Sultan Al Nahyan became the president and Rashid bin Saeed Al Maktoum the vice president. On the same day Maktoum bin Rashid Al Maktoum was given the task of forming the government. The cabinet was announced on 9 December and lasted until 1973 when the second government was established.

List of cabinet members
The first cabinet of the United Arab Emirates consisted of the following:

References

1971 establishments in the United Arab Emirates
Government of the United Arab Emirates
Cabinets established in 1971
Cabinets disestablished in 1973
1973 disestablishments in the United Arab Emirates